Podocarpus archboldii is a species of conifer in the family Podocarpaceae. It is endemic to the island of New Guinea, which is divided between Indonesia and Papua New Guinea. It is found in humid montane tropical forests from 720 to 2,600 metres elevation.<ref name="iucn status 17 November 2021">

References

aracensis
Endemic flora of New Guinea
Least concern plants
Taxonomy articles created by Polbot